Butova Kurya is a rural locality (a village) in Krasnopolyanskoye Rural Settlement, Nikolsky District, Vologda Oblast, Russia. The population was 183 as of 2002.

Geography 
Butova Kurya is located 28 km northwest of Nikolsk (the district's administrative centre) by road. Ivantets is the nearest rural locality.

References 

Rural localities in Nikolsky District, Vologda Oblast